The Chinese Ambassador to Lithuania was the official representative of the People's Republic of China to the Republic of Lithuania.

List of representatives

References 

 
Lithuania
China